Marcelo José Zamora Gonzales (born January 24, 1987) is a Peruvian footballer who plays as a center back. He currently plays for Comerciantes Unidos in the Torneo Descentralizado.

Club career
On January 28, 2010 it was announced that Zamora joined First Division side Colegio Nacional de Iquitos for the start of the new season.
Marcelo played his first match in the Peruvian First Division in Round 2 of the 2010 season at home against Sport Boys. The manager César Gonzales allowed Marcelo to start the match along with Jahir Butrón in the center of defence. The match finished 3–1 in favor of the home team, but Zamora was given a yellow card and was substituted by midfielder Juan Pablo Vergara in the 55th minute.

References

External links

1987 births
Living people
Footballers from Lima
Peruvian footballers
Deportivo Municipal footballers
Colegio Nacional Iquitos footballers
Cienciano footballers
Comerciantes Unidos footballers
Association football central defenders